The Koda is a river in the Djugu Territory, Ituri province, Democratic Republic of the Congo. The name is also spelled Kodda or Kodha.

Course

The river starts in the Lendu Plateau northwest of Lake Albert, in the farmlands south and southwest of Kpandroma, at an altitude of about 2050 m. It initially runs a fairly level course in the general south direction, about 4 km east of Mount Aboro (the highest peak in the plateau). Near , at about 2000 m altitude, it starts running down the steep slope of the plateau in the direction of Lake Albert.  It is the spine of the Bai valley, about 5 km long and 1.5 km wide, that ends at about 1050 m of altitude.

Fauna and flora
Along its descent down the slope of the plateau, the river runs through the Tsili forest, that spans across the Bai (Koda River) valley and the adjacent Ndoogo valley to the east.  As of 2016, this forest was about 2 km long, centered near , at about 1500 m of altitude and about 1.5 km north of the village Ndeke3.  It is a small relic of the climax tropical forest that once covered the plateau and its slopes.  The region, and a few more forest patches to its southwest, are one of the last refuges of a subspecies of chimpanzee, Pan troglodytes schweinfurthii.  At least six other non-human primate species have been reported in the region. 

A documentary film tells the story of the discovery "in live" of this unknown population of chimpanzees, and the scientific researches that have been led in the area by Dr Anne Laudisoit and her team : "MBUDHA, in the chimpanzees' footsteps" (directed by Caroline Thirion, produced by Gedeon Programmes, Clair-obscur Productions and Ushuaïa TV).

References

Rivers of the Democratic Republic of the Congo